The 1987 America East men's basketball tournament was hosted by the higher seeds in head-to-head matchups. The final was held at Matthews Arena on the campus of the Northeastern University. Only the top-8 schools made it to the 1987 tournament, therefore excluding both Colgate and Hartford. Northeastern gained its fourth consecutive and sixth overall America East Conference Championship and an automatic berth to the NCAA tournament with its win over Boston University. Northeastern was given the 14th seed in the East Regional of the NCAA Tournament and lost in the first round to Purdue 104–95. Niagara University gained a bid to the NIT and lost in the second round to La Salle 89–81, after beating Seton Hall 74–65.

Bracket and Results

See also
America East Conference

References

America East Conference men's basketball tournament
1986–87 ECAC North men's basketball season